The Ovalo Aguascalientes México is a car racing track in Aguascalientes, Aguascalientes, Mexico.  The OAM was inaugurated in 2009. OAM has a capacity for 35,000 people.

It is the fastest oval in Mexico.

Layout

NASCAR PEAK Mexico Series
The oval has been venue for NASCAR PEAK Mexico Series events since 2009.

References

External links
 Official Site
Ovalo Aguascalientes race results at Racing-Reference 

NASCAR tracks
Aguascalientes
Sports venues in Aguascalientes